Rafflesia hasseltii is a parasitic plant species of the genus Rafflesia. It can be found in Kerinci Seblat National Park, Sumatra, Indonesia.

Uses
Traditional tribes such as the Orang Asli sell the flowers as a folk medicine. Researchers in Malaysia slashed a group of 36 rats and smeared either the powdered flower mashed into a hydrogel paste (at two concentrations), a commercial hydrogel for wounds, or a placebo on the wounds. They conclude that wounds of the surviving rats smeared with the flower or hydrogel looked to them as if they had healed nicer than those of the placebo rats, although there was no significant difference between flower concentrations or commercial hydrogel.

References

hasseltii
Endemic flora of Sumatra